In mathematics, particularly in operator theory and C*-algebra theory, a continuous functional calculus is a functional calculus which allows the application of a continuous function to normal elements of a C*-algebra.

Theorem
Theorem.  Let x be a normal element of a C*-algebra A with an identity element e. Let C be the C*-algebra of the bounded continuous functions on the spectrum σ(x) of x. Then there exists a unique mapping  π : C → A, where π(f) is denoted f(x), such that π is a unit-preserving morphism of C*-algebras and π(1) = e and π(id) = x, where id denotes the function z → z on σ(x).

In particular, this theorem implies that bounded normal operators on a Hilbert space have a continuous functional calculus.
Its proof is almost immediate from the Gelfand representation: it suffices to assume A is the C*-algebra of continuous functions on some compact space X and define 

Uniqueness follows from application of the Stone–Weierstrass theorem. Furthermore, the spectral mapping theorem holds:

See also
 Borel functional calculus
 Holomorphic functional calculus

References

External links

 Continuous functional calculus on PlanetMath

Theory of continuous functions
C*-algebras
Functional calculus